Ana Rita Andrade Gomes (born 8 August 1976), known as Ana Rita, is a Portuguese former footballer who played as a defender. She has been a member of the Portugal women's national team. Unusually for an elite footballer, Ana Rita is deaf.

International goals
Scores and results list Portugal's goal tally first

References

External links

Profile at Aupa Athletic 

1976 births
Living people
Portuguese women's footballers
Women's association football defenders
Portugal women's international footballers
Primera División (women) players
Sporting de Huelva players
Expatriate women's footballers in Spain
Portuguese expatriate sportspeople in Spain
Portuguese expatriate sportspeople in Iceland
Expatriate women's footballers in Iceland
Úrvalsdeild kvenna (football) players
ÍR women's football players
FH women's football players
S.U. 1º Dezembro (women) players
Portuguese deaf people
Deaf sportspeople